= Above, Below =

Australian metalcore group

- Origin: Sydney, Australia
- Genre: Metalcore
- Years active: 2015–present
- Members: Jacob Wilkes; Zac Adamson; Isaac Ross; Dylan Mallia
- Website: abvblw.com

Above, Below are an Australian metalcore group formed in 2015 and consisting of Jacob Wilkes, Zac Adamson, Isaac Ross and Dylan Mallia.

In September 2019, they released their debut studio album, The Lotus Chapters and in February 2026, I Guess It Was Nowhere, which entered the top 50 of the ARIA Albums Chart.

== Career ==
Above, Below started as a bedroom project between five close friends in 2015. In 2016, they released their debut single "Paradise", followed by their debut EP, The Sower of Discord in January 2017.

In September 2019, they released their debut studio album, The Lotus Chapters, a concept album set across three chapters.

In February 2026, they released their second studio album, I Guess It Was Nowhere.

== Members ==
Current

- Jacob Wilkes – vocals (2015–present)
- Zac Adamson – guitars (2015–present)
- Isaac Ross – drums (2015–present)
- Dylan Mallia – bass (2018–present)

Former

- Louis Michaelis – bass (2015–2018)
- Nicholas Bird – guitar (2015–2020)

== Discography ==
=== Albums ===
List of studio albums, with selected details
Title	Album details	Peak chart positions
Title	Album details	AUS
The Lotus Chapters	Released: 27 September 2019; Format: CD, digital, LP (limited to 150 copies); Label: Above, Below (ABDR001)	—
I Guess It Was Nowhere	Released: 20 February 2026; Format: CD, LP, cassette, digital; Label: Above, Below (ABDR002)	35

=== Extended plays ===
List of EPs, with selected details
Title	EP details
The Sowers of Discord	Released: January 2017; Format: digital, (LP (2024)); Label: Above, Below, Summit Distro (SD-039)
